Kazuo Iwama may refer to:
Kazuo Iwama (Sony) (1919–1982), president of the Sony Corporation
 (born 1936)
Kazuo Iwama (computer scientist) (born 1951), Japanese computer science researcher